The 1863 Louisiana gubernatorial (Confederate) election was the fourth election to take place under the Louisiana Constitution of 1852. As a result of this election Henry Watkins Allen became Governor of Confederate-controlled Louisiana.

Results
Popular Vote

References

1863
Gubernatorial
Louisiana
November 1863 events